Corridor or The Corridor may refer to:

Arts, entertainment, and media

Films
The Corridor (1968 film), a 1968 Swedish drama film
The Corridor (1995 film), a 1995 Lithuanian drama film
The Corridor (2010 film), a 2010 Canadian horror film
The Corridor (2013 film), a 2013 Iranian drama film
 Corridor (film), a 2013 horror short film

Other uses in arts, entertainment, and media
 Corridor (album), a 2009 album by Japanese pop singer Miki Imai
 Corridor (comics), the first Indian graphic novel, written by Sarnath Banerjee
 Corridor (short story collection), a short story collection by Alfian Sa'at, published in 1999
 The Corridor (opera), a 2009 chamber opera composed by Harrison Birtwistle
 Corridor Digital, an American production studio based in Los Angeles

Passageways
 A narrow hallway, or corridor, a passageway to provide access between rooms inside a building
A passageway along a corridor coach
Wildlife corridor

Transportation 
 Corridor (Via Rail), a rail network running from Quebec City to Windsor, Ontario, Canada
 Air corridor, a designated travel path for aircraft
 Transport corridor, a (generally linear) tract of land in which at least one main line for some mode of transport has been built
 Corridor, a highway that is part of the Appalachian Development Highway System in the United States
 Highway corridor, a general path that a highway follows
 Humanitarian corridor

Other uses
 Operation Corridor,  a Serb military operation in Bosnia in 1992
 The Corridor, Bath, an early shopping arcade built in Bath, Somerset, England in 1825

See also 

 Cloister